Jean Fernando Augustin (born 25 April 1980) is a Mauritian sprinter who specializes in the 400 metres.

In 2002 he finished fifth at the 2002 African Championships, and was selected to represent Africa in 4 x 400 metres relay at the 2002 IAAF World Cup. The African team, with Adem Hecini, Sofiane Labidi, Fernando Augustin and compatriot Eric Milazar, won the bronze medal.

His personal best time is 46.04 seconds, achieved in March 2002 in Bamako. He also co-holds the Mauritian record in  relay, 38.99 seconds from the 2001 World Championships with teammates Arnaud Casquette, Eric Milazar and Stéphan Buckland.

Achievements in Athletics

References

External links
 

1980 births
Living people
Mauritian male sprinters
Athletes (track and field) at the 2000 Summer Olympics
Athletes (track and field) at the 2004 Summer Olympics
Olympic athletes of Mauritius
Athletes (track and field) at the 1998 Commonwealth Games
Athletes (track and field) at the 2002 Commonwealth Games
Athletes (track and field) at the 2006 Commonwealth Games
Athletes (track and field) at the 2010 Commonwealth Games
Commonwealth Games competitors for Mauritius